Kabaddi is a 2014 Nepali romantic drama film written and directed by Ram Babu Gurung. It portrays the story of a love triangle among three central characters. The film was produced by Raunak Bikram Kandel, Nischal Basnet and Sunil Rauniyar and starred Nischal Basnet, Dayahang Rai, Rishma Gurung and Rajan Khatiwada. The film was released on April 25, 2014 with extremely positive review from critics and audience for its rawness, screenplay, performances and direction. The became a blockbuster at the box office and remains cult classic film of Nepali cinema. The film is also considered as a landmark in film in modern Nepali cinema. The film had two sequels, Kabaddi Kabaddi was released in November 2015 which also became huge success critically and commercially. Its third part Kabaddi Kabaddi Kabaddi was released on 20 September 2019 and became the highest grossing film of the franchise and one of the highest grossing films ever in Nepal. Now, Its forth part Kabaddi 4: The Final Match has hit to the theatres on 27 May 2022 and has broke all records of Nepali Cinema till now.

Plot
Kazi, a third-standard-failed young man from Mustang, Nepal, dreams of marrying Maiyya, daughter of his maternal uncle, by any means. Maiyya, a student of high school, on the other hand, is peeved by his idiotic behaviors. This rejection from Maiyya always disappoints Kazi but never disheartens him. Supported by his two childhood friends Beekay and Chantyal, he finally decides to marry Maiyya through capture marriage, which is illegal but still practiced by some ethnic communities in Mustang. To find her long-gone father and to continue her studies in Kathmandu, Maiyya elopes with a visitor named "Bibek". Inflamed by her disappearance, Kazi heads to Kathmandu in search of Maiyya and finds himself trapped in a city conspiracy. Bibek turns out to be a broken man trying to take revenge against Maiyya's father. Though Kazi succeeds in getting Maiyya safely back home, the duo's love story still fails to move forward, with Maiyya attending high school and Kazi waiting outside the school with a bouquet as usual.

Cast&Crew
Dayahang Rai as Kaji
Nischal Basnet as Bibek
Rishma Gurung as Maiyya
Rajan Khatiwada as Bibek's Friend
Bijaya Baral as Bir Kaji a.k.a B.K.
Buddhi Tamang as Buddhi Lal Magar a.k.a Chhantyal
Dan Simpson as himself
Aruna Karki Pokharel
Sishir Bangdel as Ambir
Pashupati Rai
Gobinda Rai
Kamal Mani Nepal
Puskar Gurung
Kabita Ale
Upendra Subba
Pradeep Chaudhary
Junu Bista
Hikmat Thapaliya
Suraj Yadav
Uttam Neupane as Sound design, Sound mixer

Soundtrack

Awards

References

Films directed by Ram Babu Gurung
2014 films
Nepalese romantic drama films
Films produced by Nischal Basnet